Alcove may refer to:

Places
 Alcove, Quebec, a town in Quebec, Canada

 Alcove Canyon, a valley in Arizona, U.S.
 Alcove Springs, a former stop along the Oregon Trail in Kansas, U.S.
 Alcove House, in Bandelier National Monument, Los Alamos and Santa Fe counties, New Mexico, United States
 Alcove, New York, a hamlet in New York, U.S.
 Alcove Historic District, Alcove in Albany County, New York, U.S.
 Alcove Reservoir, Albany County, New York, U.S.

Other uses
 Alcove (architecture), a recessed part of a room or a garden
 Alcove (landform), a steep-sided cavity on a rock face, formed through water or wind erosion
 Alcove Entertainment, a film production company
 L'alcôve, 1847  by Jacques Offenbach
 The Alcove, a 1985 Italian film